Cándido is a Spanish male given name, equivalent of Portuguese Cândido.

Those with the name include:
 Cándido Bareiro (1833–1880), President of Paraguay
 Cándido Fabré, Cuban musician
 Cándido López (1840–1902), Argentine painter and soldier
 Cándido Muatetema Rivas (born 1960), former Prime Minister of Equatorial Guinea

See also

 Candido
 Cândido